Caracaraí is a municipality located in the state of Roraima in Brazil. Caracaraí is located on the Branco River.

Overview 
Caracaraí was founded by cattle ranchers from Moura. The town was originally known as Cidade Porto and was the capital of the Rio Branco Territory which was later renamed Roraima.

The word caracaraí means "little hawk", a very common bird in the region. Its territory cuts Roraima's in two and keeps boundaries with both the Brazilian state of Amazonas and the country of Guyana, though the Guyana portion it borders is disputed with Venezuela
It is not the only municipality in the state to do so; Caroebe also borders both Amazonas and Guyana, and has boundaries with Pará as well. 

Caracaraí is located near the intersection of the BR-174 and BR-210 highways. Caracaraí became an independent municipality in 1955. Between 1960 and 1982, the municipality contained the districts of Santa Maria do Boiaçu and São José de Anauá. Santa Maria do Boiaçu became part of the municipality of Rorainópolis.

The municipality contains the Caracaraí Ecological Station and the Niquiá Ecological Station.

The economy used to be based on cattle ranching. The cattle used to shipped to Manaus. Caracaraí developed in the supply centre for the region, because it is located on the Branco River south of the waterfalls. It is the largest producer of fish in the state.

References

External links 
 Official site (in Portuguese)
 

Populated places established in 1955
Municipalities in Roraima
1955 establishments in Brazil